1801 Hollis Street is an office building in downtown Halifax, Nova Scotia, Canada. Home to many prominent businesses, it was built in 1985 and is one of the tallest buildings in Halifax, standing at 87 metres, with 22 floors. It is located near the waterfront, in a major financial district.

History

Development
The building was designed by architecture firm Clifford Lawrie Bolton Ritchie and structural engineering consultant Read Jones Christoffersen, both of Toronto. It was developed by Manuduke Limited, a joint venture of Manufacturers Life (Manulife) and Clarence Investment Corporation. The development was approved by Halifax council in April 1983. It was built as the corporate headquarters of the Central Trust company, which was the main tenant.

Demolition of the existing buildings on the site began in 1983.

Archaeological investigation
Excavation of the site, located within the original town of Halifax settled in 1749, commenced without an archaeological survey. After a construction worker contacted the Nova Scotia Museum in January 1984, archaeologists from Parks Canada and Saint Mary's University were called in. By this time, the site was already badly damaged, with most material having been trucked away to a landfill and the archaeological context destroyed. Around 1,000 artifacts were collected in a "rescue recovery" operation conducted at the northwest corner of the site. A separate salvage operation was carried out at the landfill. In total, around 25,000 artifacts were collected, mostly ceramics (18,673 items). The findings of these efforts were documented in a report, Artifacts from Eighteenth Century Halifax: The Central Trust Archaeological Project, published by the Saint Mary's University Archaeology Laboratory in 1987.

Opening and renaming
Originally known as the Central Trust Tower and built at a cost of around C$25 million, the building was officially opened by Manulife in June 1985. The building was also known as the Central Guaranty Trust Tower following the merger of Central Trust and Guaranty Trust Co., but was re-branded as "1801 Hollis Street" when the trust company closed in 1997.

Design
The tower is served by five elevators. The majority of the building is office space, but there is also a ground-floor food outlet on Upper Water St.

The building has frontage on three streets: Upper Water, Duke, and Hollis. There is a small plaza on Duke Street. The underground car park, accessed from Upper Water Street, has 67 parking spaces.

Ownership
1801 Hollis Street was owned by Canadian Real Estate Investment Trust (CREIT), which in 2018 was purchased by Choice Properties REIT, controlled by Loblaw Companies.

In 2022, the building was sold by Choice Properties to Montreal-based Groupe Mach for C$40 million.

Transportation
1801 Hollis Street is located across the street from the Water Street Terminal, a hub for Halifax Transit buses, as well as the Halifax Ferry Terminal.

See also
 List of tallest buildings in Halifax, Nova Scotia

Further reading

References

1985 establishments in Nova Scotia
Buildings and structures in Halifax, Nova Scotia
Office buildings completed in 1985